97P/Metcalf–Brewington is a periodic Jupiter-family comet originally discovered by Joel H. Metcalf in 1906 but subsequently lost. A new observation in 1991 by Howard J. Brewington was matched to the 1906 sighting; the orbit was computed and the comet was observed again on its returns to perihelion in 2001, 2011, and 2022.

References
 

Periodic comets
0097
Discoveries by Joel Hastings Metcalf
Comets in 2011
19061010